Djaul may refer to:

Dyaul Island in the New Ireland chain of Papua New Guinea
Tiang language also known as the Djaul language and spoken on Dyaul Island